Non-Filter or Non Filter is a category of air purification system created by Microgenix Technology Ltd., a UK-based company that invented the technology.

The technology is composed of two proprietary elements. An anti-microbial agent applied to a special medium kills pathogens, and an ultraviolet light chamber provides added security. Systems in the Non-Filter category derive their functionality from devices other than conventional HEPA filters. HEPA filters are designed to capture particles down to a size of 0.3 micrometres, but some bacteria and most viruses are much smaller. The Microgenix Air Purification system does not capture and store pathogens but rather kills them with a very low air pressure loss.

Filters